The 2017 Syed Modi International Grand Prix Gold was the second grand prix's badminton tournament of the 2017 BWF Grand Prix Gold and Grand Prix. The tournament was held at the Babu Banarasi Das Indoor Stadium in Lucknow, India on 24 – 29 January 2017 and had a total purse of $120,000.

Tournament
The 2017 Syed Modi International Grand Prix Gold was the eight edition of Syed Modi International Badminton Championships. This tournament has been rate as Grand Prix level since it was sanctioned by BWF in 2009. The competition has provided a great platform for some of the younger badminton players to prove their mettle against some of the best in the world. This tournament named to commemorate the 1982 Commonwealth Games champion Syed Modi. This tournament inaugurated by the Uttar Pradesh governor Ram Naik. The inaugural ceremony of the tournament presented a glittering tweet in which many international stars and dance-to-party programs.

Venue
This international tournament held at the Babu Banarasi Das Indoor Stadium, Lucknow, Uttar Pradesh, India.

Point distribution
Below is the tables with the point distribution for each phase of the tournament based on the BWF points system.

Prize money
The total prize money for this year tournament is US$120,000.

Blood donation camp
This tournament also organized a blood donation camp in the morning session on 27 January with the help of Red Cross Society. The officers of the international umpire, coaches, officials and the U.P. Olympic Association affiliated with badminton also assist in this righteous work of blood donation.

Men's singles

Seeds

 Tanongsak Saensomboonsuk (withdrew)
 Hans-Kristian Vittinghus (quarterfinals)
 Srikanth Kidambi (semifinals)
 Ajay Jayaram (withdrew)
 Anders Antonsen (third round)
 H.S. Prannoy (third round)
 Zulfadli Zulkiffli (quarterfinals)
 Sameer Verma (champion)
 B. Sai Praneeth (final)
 Chong Wei Feng (third round)
 Sourabh Varma (quarterfinals)
 Emil Holst (quarterfinals)
 Misha Zilberman (third round)
 Parupalli Kashyap (withdrew)
 Harsheel Dani (semifinals)
 Pratul Joshi (second round)

Finals

Top half

Section 1

Section 2

Section 3

Section 4

Bottom half

Section 5

Section 6

Section 7

Section 8

Women's singles

Seeds

 P. V. Sindhu (champion)
 Saina Nehwal (withdrew)
 Beatriz Corrales (quarterfinals)
 Fitriani (semifinals)
 Dinar Dyah Ayustine (second round)
 Hanna Ramadini (semifinals)
 Ruthvika Shivani Gadde (withdrew)
 Ksenia Polikarpova (second round)

Finals

Top half

Section 1

Section 2

Bottom half

Section 3

Section 4

Men's doubles

Seeds

 Mathias Boe / Carsten Mogensen (champion)
 Mathias Christiansen / David Daugaard (quarterfinals)
 Manu Attri / B. Sumeeth Reddy (second round)
 Fajar Alfian / Muhammad Rian Ardianto (semifinals)
 Hendra Setiawan /  Tan Boon Heong (quarterfinals)
 Danny Bawa Chrisnanta / Hendra Wijaya (quarterfinals)
 Berry Angriawan / Hardianto (semifinals)
 Lu Ching-yao / Yang Po-han (final)

Finals

Top half

Section 1

Section 2

Bottom half

Section 3

Section 4

Women's doubles

Seeds

 Kamilla Rytter Juhl / Christinna Pedersen (champion)
 Chow Mei Kuan / Lee Meng Yean (quarterfinals)
 Lim Yin Loo / Yap Cheng Wen (semifinals)
 Meghana Jakkampudi / Poorvisha S Ram (quarterfinals)

Finals

Top half

Section 1

Section 2

Bottom half

Section 3

Section 4

Mixed doubles

Seeds

 Joachim Fischer Nielsen / Christinna Pedersen (semifinals)
 Pranaav Jerry Chopra / N. Sikki Reddy (champion)
 Terry Hee Yong Kai / Tan Wei Han (quarterfinals)
 Evgenij Dremin / Evgenia Dimova (quarterfinals)
 Mathias Christiansen / Sara Thygesen (semifinals)
 Goh Soon Huat / Shevon Jemie Lai (quarterfinals)
 B. Sumeeth Reddy / Ashwini Ponnappa (final)
 Yogendran Khrishnan /  Prajakta Sawant (quarterfinals)

Finals

Top half

Section 1

Section 2

Bottom half

Section 3

Section 4

References

External links 
 Tournament Link
 Badmintonindia.org

2017 Grand Prix Gold
India
2017 in Indian sport
2017 in badminton
Sport in Lucknow
January 2017 sports events in Asia